The 1933 Diexi earthquake occurred in Diexi, Mao County, Szechwan, Republic of China on August 25 with a moment magnitude of 7.3 and a maximum Mercalli intensity of X (Extreme). With up to 9,300 killed, this was the deadliest earthquake in 1933.

This earthquake destroyed the town of Diexi and surrounding villages, and caused many landslides. The old town of Diexi was submerged in landslide dam-created Diexi Lake.

See also
2008 Sichuan earthquake
List of earthquakes in 1933
List of earthquakes in China
List of earthquakes in Sichuan

References

External links

1933 in China
1933 Diexi
1933 earthquakes
1930 disasters in China